Ellingham is a former railway station in Ellingham, Norfolk. It was opened in 1863 as part of the Waveney Valley Line between Tivetshall and Beccles, Suffolk. It was closed to passengers in 1953 and closed fully on 19 April 1965, when the last goods train called there. The station still stands much altered

References

External links
 Ellingham station on navigable 1946 O. S. map

Disused railway stations in Norfolk
Former Great Eastern Railway stations
Railway stations in Great Britain opened in 1863
Railway stations in Great Britain closed in 1953